The Montego 20 is an American trailerable sailboat that was designed by Johannes "Jopie" Helsen as a pocket cruiser and first built in 1976.

The Montego 20 is a fixed keel development of the swing keel Montego 19. It was later developed into the Sovereign 20.

Production
The design was built by Universal Marine in St. Petersburg, Florida, United States from 1976 until 1985, but it is now out of production.

Design
The Montego 20 is a recreational keelboat, built predominantly of fiberglass, with wood trim. It has a fractional sloop rig with a deck-stepped mast, a raked stem, a plumb transom, a transom-hung rudder controlled by a tiller and a shoal draft keel. It displaces  and carries  of ballast.

The boat is normally fitted with a small  outboard motor for docking and maneuvering.

The design has sleeping accommodation for four people, with a double "V"-berth in the bow cabin and two straight settee berths in the main cabin. The galley is located on both sides, just aft of the bow cabin. The galley is equipped with a single-burner stove to port and sink to starboard. A  icebox doubles as the companionway step. The head is located in the bow cabin, under the "V"-berth.

Operational history
In a 2010 review Steve Henkel wrote, "the Montego 20 is based on the Montego 19 ... with slightly expanded dimensions and weight. She also has a two-foot deep stub keel in place of a swing keel, which adds 10" to her minimum draft. That in combination with her 2,300 lb. weight (versus 2,150 for the Montego 19) makes her less easily trailered than the Montego 19 ... Best features: She is said to track well, no doubt mainly because of her long stub keel. The seven-foot cockpit is roomy and has high coamings for good back support. Ventilation includes four opening ports in addition to a forward hatch and companionway hatch—
great for summer climates. Her average PHRF of 282 seems a bit high, particularly against other similarly shallow fixed-keelers with more top hamper (above-the-water superstructure) like the Buccaneer 200 .... Worst features: Her very shallow keel can sideslip, especially in heavy air, reducing speed and pointing ability. The hardware as shipped is minimal; missing are a vang, cunningham, and quick-release jibsheet cleats, along with a better system for cleating the mainsheet. Her particular non-skid deck pattern can be slippery when wet."

See also
List of sailing boat types

Related development
Montego 19

References

Keelboats
1970s sailboat type designs
Sailing yachts
Trailer sailers
Sailboat type designs by Johannes "Jopie" Helsen
Sailboat types built by Universal Marine